Childhood is the age span ranging between birth and puberty. According to United Nations Children's Fund or UNICEF, minors is a period of life from birth until 20 years of age

Childhood may also refer to:

Literature
 Childhood (Tolstoy novel), an 1852 novel by Leo Tolstoy
 Childhood (Alexis novel), a 1998 novel by André Alexis
 Childhood (journal), an academic journal in the field of childhood studies

Music
 Childhood (band), an English rock band
 Childhood (album), a 1981 album by Sylvia Chang, or the title song
 "Childhood" (Michael Jackson song), 1995
 "Childhood", a song by Lo Ta-yu

Film and television
 A Childhood, a 2015 French film
 "Childhood" (Robin Hood), an episode of the BBC television series Robin Hood
 Childhoods (film), a 2007 French film

See also
 Babyhood (disambiguation)
 Child (disambiguation)